One ship and one shore establishment of the Royal Australian Navy (RAN) have been named HMAS Kuttabul.

 , a former harbour ferry acquired during World War II for use as an accommodation ship. Kuttabul was sunk by torpedo during the 1942 Japanese submarine attack on Sydney Harbour.
 , a naval base at Garden Island, New South Wales which was renamed in 1943 in honour of the accommodation ship, is the primary East Coast base of the RAN.

Royal Australian Navy ship names